O.K. Nerone is a 1951 Italian comedy film directed by Mario Soldati.

Cast
 Gino Cervi: Imperator Nero 
 Silvana Pampanini: Imperatrice Poppea
 Walter Chiari: Fiorello Capone
 Jackie Frost: Licia 
 Carlo Campanini: Jimmy Gargiulo 
 Piero Palermini: Marcus 
 Giulio Donnini: Tigellinus 
 Alda Mangini: Sophonisba, l'Incantatrice
 Alba Arnova: Ballerina
 Rocco D'Assunta: Pannunzia, il Prefetto
 Enzo Fiermonte: Gladiatore 
 Giacomo Furia: Harbinger 
 Rosario Borelli: Tullio 
 Mario Siletti: Seneca 
 Umberto Sacripante: Commesso
 Pietro Tordi: Gladiatore della Gallia

External links
 

1951 films
1950s Italian-language films
Films set in ancient Rome
Films set in the Roman Empire
Films directed by Mario Soldati
Films scored by Mario Nascimbene
Depictions of Nero on film
Italian comedy films
1951 comedy films
Italian black-and-white films
1950s Italian films